The 2006 Portuguese presidential election was held on 22 January to elect a successor to the incumbent President Jorge Sampaio, who was term-limited from running for a third consecutive term by the Constitution of Portugal. The result was a victory in the first round for Aníbal Cavaco Silva of the Social Democratic Party candidate, the former Prime Minister, won 50.54 percent of the vote in the first round, just over the majority required to avoid a runoff election. It was the first time in which a right-wing candidate was elected President of the Republic since the 1974 Carnation Revolution.

Voter turnout was 61.53 percent for eligible voters.

Procedure 
Any Portuguese citizen over 35 years old has the opportunity to run for president. In order to do so it is necessary to gather between 7500 and 15000 signatures and submit them to the Portuguese Constitutional Court.

According to the Portuguese Constitution, to be elected, a candidate needs a majority of votes. If no candidate gets this majority there will take place a second round between the two most voted candidates.

Political context 
In the presidential election of 14 January 2001, the outgoing Socialist Jorge Sampaio was re-elected in the first round with 55% of votes. Because he was term-limited, he was forbidden, by the Constitution, to run for a third consecutive term.

In the parliamentary elections of 20 February 2005, the Socialist Party, led by José Sócrates, won for the first time in its history an absolute majority of seats, while the Social Democratic Party led by Prime Minister Pedro Santana Lopes fell below 30%, their worst result since 1983.

To cope with the bad fiscal situation, the government introduced a policy of fiscal restraint, combining higher taxes, lower public treatments and privatizations. Adding to this, a bad summer in terms of wildfires put more pressure in the government. This policies were not popular and as a result, the Socialists were defeated in the local elections on 9 October 2005. In the follow up for the presidential elections, the Socialists decided to nominate their former secretary-general, Mário Soares, President of the Republic between 1986 and 1996. This decision divided the party, which led Manuel Alegre, a member of the party parliamentary group, to announce his candidature as an independent. The Social Democratic Party opted to support their former leader Aníbal Cavaco Silva, Prime Minister from 1985 to 1995, and presidential candidate defeated in 1996.

Candidates 
Thirteen citizens sought election officially, but only six gathered the 7,500 signatures required under the constitution to be a candidate in the poll:

Official candidates 
 Manuel Alegre, a Socialist Party politician who ran without the official backing of his party;
 Aníbal Cavaco Silva, Prime Minister from 1985 to 1995, supported by the Social Democratic Party and by the People's Party;
 Francisco Louçã, coordinator of the political commission of the Left Bloc;
 Garcia Pereira, Secretary-General of the PCTP/MRPP;
 Mário Soares, President from 1986 to 1996, the official candidate of the Socialist Party; and
 Jerónimo de Sousa, Secretary-General of the Portuguese Communist Party, also supported by the Ecologist Party "The Greens".

All the candidates except for Cavaco Silva are considered to be from the Portuguese political left.

Unsuccessful candidacies 

The other potential candidates who, according to the Constitutional Court, did not gather enough signatures, were:
 Josué Rodrigues Gonçalo Pedro;
 Luís Filipe Guerra, leader of the Humanist Party;
 Teresa Lameiro;
 Manuela Magno, nuclear physicist;
 Carmelinda Pereira, leader of the Workers Party of Socialist Unity (POUS);
 Luís Botelho Ribeiro; and
 Diamantino da Silva;

Campaign period

Party slogans

Candidates' debates

Opinion polling

Results 

 Summary of the 22 January 2006 Portuguese presidential election results
|-
!style="background-color:#E9E9E9;text-align:left;" colspan="2" rowspan="2"|Candidates 
!style="background-color:#E9E9E9;text-align:left;" rowspan="2"|Supporting parties 	
!style="background-color:#E9E9E9;text-align:right;" colspan="2"|First round
|-
!style="background-color:#E9E9E9;text-align:right;"|Votes
!style="background-color:#E9E9E9;text-align:right;"|%
|-
|style="width:10px;background-color:#FF9900;text-align:center;"| 
|style="text-align:left;"|Aníbal Cavaco Silva
|style="text-align:left;"|Social Democratic Party, People's Party
|style="text-align:right;"|2,773,431
|style="text-align:right;"|50.54
|-
|style="width: 5px" style="background-color:#777777;text-align:center;"|
|style="text-align:left;"|Manuel Alegre
|style="text-align:left;"|Independent
|style="text-align:right;"|1,138,297
|style="text-align:right;"|20.74
|-
|style="width: 5px" style="background-color:#FF66FF;text-align:center;"| 
|style="text-align:left;"|Mário Soares
|style="text-align:left;"|Socialist Party
|style="text-align:right;"|785,355
|style="text-align:right;"|14.31
|-
|style="width: 5px" style="background-color:red;text-align:center;"| 
|style="text-align:left;"|Jerónimo de Sousa
|style="text-align:left;"|Portuguese Communist Party, Ecologist Party "The Greens"
|style="text-align:right;"|474,083
|style="text-align:right;"|8.64
|-
|style="width: 5px" style="background-color:#8B0000;text-align:center;"|
|style="text-align:left;"|Francisco Louçã
|style="text-align:left;"|Left Bloc
|style="text-align:right;"|292,198
|style="text-align:right;"|5.32
|-
|style="width: 5px" style="background-color:#CC0000;text-align:center;"|
|style="text-align:left;"|António Garcia Pereira
|style="text-align:left;"|Portuguese Workers' Communist Party
|style="text-align:right;"|23,983
|style="text-align:right;"|0.44
|-
|colspan="3" style="text-align:left;" style="background-color:#E9E9E9"|Total valid
|width="65" style="text-align:right;background-color:#E9E9E9"|5,487,347
|width="40" style="text-align:right;background-color:#E9E9E9"|100.00
|-
|style="text-align:right;" colspan="3"|Blank ballots
|width="65" style="text-align:right;"|59,636
|width="40" style="text-align:right;"|1.07
|-
|style="text-align:right;" colspan="3" |Invalid ballots
|width="65" style="text-align:right;"|43,149
|width="40" style="text-align:right;"|0.77
|-
|colspan="3" style="text-align:left;background-color:#E9E9E9"|Total
|width="65" style="text-align:right;background-color:#E9E9E9"|5,590,132
|width="40" style="text-align:right;background-color:#E9E9E9"|
|-
|colspan=3|Registered voters/turnout
||9,085,339||61.53
|-
|colspan=5 style="text-align:left;"|Source: Comissão Nacional de Eleições 
|}

Maps

See also 
 President of Portugal
 Portugal
 Politics of Portugal

References

External links 
 Portuguese Electoral Commission
 Official results site, Portuguese Justice Ministry
 NSD: European Election Database - Portugal publishes regional level election data; allows for comparisons of election results, 1990–2010

2006 elections in Portugal
2006
January 2006 events in Europe

fr:Élections présidentielles portugaises#2006